Jochem Ritmeester van de Kamp (born 2 November 2003) is a Dutch professional footballer who plays as a midfielder for Eerste Divisie club Almere City.

Career
Born in Laren, North Holland, Ritmeester van de Kamp started playing football for local club Laren '99 before he was admitted to the Almere City youth academy in 2013. He signed his first professional contract in March 2022; a three-year deal.

Ritmeester van de Kamp made his professional debut on 11 March 2022 in an Eerste Divisie match against Helmond Sport. He started the game on the bench, but head coach Alex Pastoor gave him his debut in the 85th minute when he came on for Tim Receveur. His late substitute against Helmond remained his only appearance for the first team in the 2021–22 season, as Almere finished in a disappointing 14th place.

Career statistics

References

2003 births
Living people
Sportspeople from Laren, North Holland
Dutch footballers
Association football midfielders
Almere City FC players
Eerste Divisie players
Footballers from North Holland